Cuse may refer to:

People
 Carlton Cuse (born 1959), American screenwriter, producer and director

Places
 Cuse-et-Adrisans, France
 Syracuse, New York
 Syracuse University, in the above city
 Syracuse Orange, the university's athletic program